Baby is the third studio album by The Detroit Cobras. It was originally released in the United Kingdom by Rough Trade Records in November 2004. The following year Bloodshot Records released the album in the United States. Bloodshot's release included the Seven Easy Pieces EP in its entirety.

Track listing
"Slipping Around"
Original by Art Freeman
"I Wanna Holler (But the Town's Too Small)"
Original by Gary U.S. Bonds
"Baby Let Me Hold Your Hand"
Original by Hoagy Lands
"Weak Spot"
Original by Ruby Johnson
"Everybody's Going Wild"
Original by International Kansas City Playboys
"Hot Dog (Watch Me Eat)"
The lone original song. Composed by Greg Cartwright/Mary Restrepo/Rachel Nagy
"Mean Man"
Original by Betty Harris
"Now You're Gone"
Original by Bobbie Smith & the Dreamgirls
"It's Raining"
Original by Irma Thomas
"Just Can't Please You"
Original by Jimmy Robins
"The Real Thing"
Original by The "5" Royales
"Baby Help Me"
Original by Percy Sledge
"Cha Cha Twist"
Original by Brice Coefield

Personnel
Rachel Nagy	 - 	Vocals
Maribel (Mary) Ramirez	 - 	Guitar
Joey Mazzola	 - 	Bass
Steve Nawara	 - 	Guitar
Kenny Tudrick	 - 	Percussion, Drums

References

2005 albums
The Detroit Cobras albums
Bloodshot Records albums